Abd al-Rahman al-Sharqawi (1921–1987) was an Egyptian writer.

Books and studies about him
 Confessions of Abd al-Rahman al-Sharqawi, Mustafa Abd al-Ghani, The Supreme Council of Culture, Cairo, 1996
 Al-Sharqawi, a rebel, Mustafa Abdel-Ghani, Dar Al-Taawon, Cairo, 1987.

References

External links
 ملخص كتاب «أئمة الفقه التسعة» لعبد الرحمن الشرقاوي

Egyptian poets
1921 births
1987 deaths
Egyptian writers
Date of birth missing
Date of death missing